The 2014 Women's World Team Squash Championships was the women's edition of the 2014 World Team Squash Championships, which is the world team championship for squash players. The event was held in Niagara-on-the-Lake, Canada, from December 1 to December 6, 2014. The tournament was organized by the World Squash Federation and Squash Canada. The England team won its seventh World Team Championships, beating the Malaysian team in the final.

Participating teams
20 teams competed in these world championships from all of the five confederations: Africa, America, Asia, Europe and Oceania. For Guatemala, it was their first participation at a world team championship.

Seeds

Squads

  Egypt
 Raneem El Weleily
 Nour El Sherbini
 Nour El Tayeb
 Omneya Abdel Kawy

  Ireland
 Madeline Perry
 Aisling Blake
 Laura Mylotte
 Breanne Flynn

  New Zealand
 Amanda Landers-Murphy
 Megan Craig
 Kylie Lindsay
 Rebecca Barnett

  Colombia
 Catalina Peláez
 Laura Tovar Pérez
 Anna Porras
 Karol Gonzalez

  China
 Li Dongjin
 Gu Jinyue
 Xiu Chen
 Duan Siyu

  England
 Laura Massaro
 Alison Waters
 Sarah-Jane Perry
 Emma Beddoes

  Australia
 Rachael Grinham
 Lisa Camilleri
 Sarah Cardwell
 Christine Nunn

  Wales
 Tesni Evans
 Deon Saffery
 Jenny Haley
 Elin Harlow

  Germany
 Sina Wall
 Franziska Hennes
 Annika Wiese
 Nicole Fries

  Spain
 Xisela Aranda Núñez
 Cristina Gómez
 Marina De Juan Gallach
 Margaux Moros

  Malaysia
 Nicol David
 Low Wee Wern
 Delia Arnold
 Zulhijjah Binti Azan

  United States
 Amanda Sobhy
 Olivia Blatchford
 Natalie Grainger
 Sabrina Sobhy

  Canada
 Samantha Cornett
 Danielle Letourneau
 Nikki Todd
 Hollie Naughton

  Mexico
 Samantha Terán
 Diana García
 Nayelly Hernández
 Karla Urrutia

  Guatemala
 Winifer Bonilla
 Pamela Anckermann
 Nicolle Anckermann
 Irena Barillas

  Hong Kong
 Annie Au
 Joey Chan
 Liu Tsz-Ling
 Tong Tsz-Wing

  France
 Camille Serme
 Coline Aumard
 Laura Pomportes
 Cyrielle Peltier

  South Africa
 Siyoli Waters
 Milnay Louw
 Cheyna Tucker
 Alexandra Fuller

  India
 Joshna Chinappa
 Anaka Alankamony
 Sachika Ingale
 Harshit Kaur Jawanda

  Austria
 Birgit Coufal
 Jacqueline Peychär
 Anja Kaserer
 Lisa Kaserer

Group stage

Pool A 
December 1, 2014

December 2, 2014

December 3, 2014

Pool B 
December 1, 2014

December 2, 2014

December 3, 2014

Pool C 
December 1, 2014

December 2, 2014

December 3, 2014

Pool D 
December 1, 2014

December 2, 2014

December 3, 2014

Finals

Draw

Results

Quarter-finals

Semi-finals

Final

Post-tournament team ranking

See also 
 World Team Squash Championships
 2014 Women's World Open Squash Championship

References

External links 
Squash Canada website
Women's World Squash Team website

World Squash Championships
Squash
W
Squash tournaments in Canada
2014 in women's squash
International sports competitions hosted by Canada